The Daily Journal is the only local daily newspaper in Kankakee, Illinois.  Its surrounding circulation area is Kankakee County, which includes the adjacent municipalities of Bourbonnais and Bradley.  The newspaper also circulates in portions of the adjacent counties of Ford, Grundy, Iroquois, Livingston, and Will.  The newspaper circulates five days a week, on the four afternoons of Monday through Thursday and a fifth daily edition on Saturday morning.  No papers are published on Friday or on Sunday.  The newspaper was founded in 1903.

References

External links
Daily Journal website
Newspaper begins 150th year today (August 29, 2002, updated October 14, 2013), Daily Journal.
Newspaper sale announced (May 18, 2019), by Lee Provost, Daily Journal.

Kankakee, Illinois
Newspapers published in Illinois
1903 establishments in Illinois
Publications established in 1903